Forever Blue may refer to:

 Forever Blue (Chris Isaak album), 1995
 Forever Blue (Blue System album), 1995
 "Forever Blue" (Cold Case), a television  episode
 Forever Blue (video game) or Endless Ocean, a 2007 scuba-themed game for Wii
 "Forever Blue", a 1989 single by Swing Out Sister from Kaleidoscope World
 "Forever Blue", a 1986 song by Little River Band from No Reins